NTT may refer to:
 National Native Title Tribunal (NTT), Australian government instrumentality
 NATO countries, as per NATO country code
 New Technology Telescope, a 3.6m telescope at La Silla Observatory, Chile
 New Technology Train, a series of the New York City Subway made from 1999 onwards
 New trade theory, an economic theory
 Niuatoputapu Airport, IATA code
 Nippon Telegraph and Telephone (NTT), a Japanese telecommunications company
 Nottinghamshire, county in England, Chapman code
 NTT Docomo, a mobile phone operator, subsidiary of NTT founded in 1991
 NTT Ltd., a global technology and services provider, subsidiary of NTT founded in 2019
 Number theoretic transform, a mathematical transform
 East Nusa Tenggara, a province of Indonesia known as Nusa Tenggara Timur in Indonesian language.
 non-traditional tincture (heraldry)